The Carnegie Mellon Tartans football team represents Carnegie Mellon University in National Collegiate Athletic Association (NCAA) Division III competition.

History
On November 28, 1926, the 6–2 Carnegie Tech football team shut out Knute Rockne's undefeated Notre Dame Fighting Irish 19–0 at Forbes Field. It was the only loss for the Irish that season and only the second time they allowed a touchdown. The game was ranked the fourth-greatest upset in college football history by ESPN.

Bowl game and AP rankings
In the 1930s, Carnegie Tech (as it was known then) was among the top college football programs in the country. In 1938 and 1939, the team achieved national rankings in the AP Poll. Ranked sixth at the end of the 1938 regular season, the Tartans earned a January bowl game invitation, but lost  to  top-ranked TCU in the Sugar Bowl in New Orleans.

Carnegie Tech's AP ranking history:
 #13 – October 17, 1938
 #16 – October 24, 1938 
 #19 – October 31, 1938 
   #6  – November 7, 1938 
   #6  – November 14, 1938 
   #7  – November 21, 1938 
   #6  – November 28, 1938 
   #6  – December 5, 1938 (Final)
 #15 – October 16, 1939

Decline and resurgence
The team lost 26 straight games from 1942 through 1948 (the 1944 and 1945 seasons were cancelled due to World War II). In the last game of the 1948 season, the team beat Grove City, 7–0, on a 51-yard touchdown run by freshman halfback John Luchok. The team improved over the next six years, culminating in the first undefeated season in school history in 1954. That team was led by quarterback Guy Carricato, halfback Eddy Miller and end Chuck Luchok, John Luchok's younger brother.

Modern achievements
In 2006, the varsity football team was offered a bid to the NCAA Division III playoffs, and became one of the first teams in school history (the first team to win a Division III playoff game was in 1977, when Carnegie Mellon beat Dayton) and University Athletic Association (UAA) conference history to win an NCAA playoff game with a 21–0 shutout of Millsaps College of the SCAC conference. In addition to winning a playoff game, several team members were elected to the All American and All Region Squads. The 2006 team won more games in a single season than any other team in school history. The team was previously coached by Rich Lackner, who is also a graduate of Carnegie Mellon and who was the head coach from 1986 to 2021.

Playoff appearances

NCAA Division III
The Tartans have appeared in the Division III playoffs eight times, with an overall record of 4–8.

References

External links

 
American football teams established in 1906
1906 establishments in Pennsylvania